Breweries in Montana produce a wide range of beers in different styles that are marketed locally, regionally, and nationally. Brewing companies vary widely in the volume and variety of beer produced,  from small nanobreweries and microbreweries to massive multinational conglomerate macrobreweries.

In 2012 Montana's 38 brewing establishments (including breweries, brewpubs, importers, and company-owned packagers and wholesalers) employed 220 people directly, and more than 4,700 others in related jobs such as wholesaling and retailing. As of August 2016, there are 68 breweries in operation in the state of Montana.

Including people directly employed in brewing, as well as those who supply Montana's breweries with everything from ingredients to machinery, the total business and personal tax revenue generated by Montana's breweries and related industries was more than $98 million. Consumer purchases of Montana's brewery products generated more than $21 million extra in tax revenue. In 2012, according to the Brewers Association, Montana ranked 3rd in the number of craft breweries per capita, with 36.

For context, at the end of 2013 there were 2,822 breweries in the United States, including 2,768 craft breweries subdivided into 1,237 brewpubs, 1,412 microbreweries and 119 regional craft breweries.  In that same year, according to the Beer Institute, the brewing industry employed around 43,000 Americans in brewing and distribution and had a combined economic impact of more than $246 billion.

Legal information
Definitions

According to the Montana Code Annotated 2009, section 16-1-106:

and section 16-3-213, Brewers or beer importers not to retail beer—small brewery exceptions:

Licensing
The roots of Montana's liquor licensing system date back to 1933, when Prohibition ended and taverns sprung up throughout the state. In 1947, the state enacted a quota system, allowing one tavern for every 1,500 residents of a city. However, the taverns in existence at the time were grandfathered in, and what the state considers to be an excess of liquor licenses now exists in Montana cities.

History

1863 - "Gilbert Brewery" was founded by Henry Gilbert, Christian Ritcher, and William Smith, making it one of the Montana Territory's first breweries, though it was not the first. Originally called "Thorn-Smith Brewery" and then "Virginia Brewery", the brewery continued until Montana Prohibition laws went into effect around 1916–1918.  The brewery re-opened in 1934 but closed for good in 1974.
1926 - Montana became the first state to repeal Prohibition enforcement.  The petition to lift the ban stated its purpose was "to restore constitutional rights and liberty in the state of Montana by repealing all laws relative to prohibition except those relating to minors." Efforts to reinstate the law two years later in 1928 failed.
1997 - The cabaret license was created as a reaction to the fast-rising prices of regular liquor licenses. Cabaret licenses are more affordable and allowed restaurant owners to sell wine and beer.

List

406 Brewing Company

406 Brewing Company is a microbrewery and tasting room in Bozeman.  It was opened by Matt Muth, a home brewer since college, in 2011, as the second brewery within Bozeman's city limits.  Due to its recent opening, its production is limited, with no brews made regularly. It plans on offering food service in the near future.

Angry Hank's Microbrewery

Angry Hank's Brewing is located in a former service station in a part of Downtown Billings known locally as the Brewery District.  It was opened in 2006 by Tim Mohr, who had worked as a brewer at Red Lodge Ales for five years.  The Angry Hank from which the brewery gets its name is not part of the organization, but instead a Miller Genuine Draft-drinking friend of the family who always seemed angry. The idea for the name came when someone, in an attempt to console Hank said to him, "Don't be angry Hank," just as Mohr and his family were having troubles deciding on a name for the then-proposed establishment.

Angry Hank's does not bottle its beer, and sells about 90% of its beer on site.  Popularity of the relatively new brewery, credited in part by Mohr to nearby downtown hotel tourists and the taproom's hours coinciding with happy hour, has led to a stretched supply.  Given such, the owner is considering expanding in the near future.

Awards

Bayern Brewing

Bayern Brewery was opened in 1987 as the "only German brewery in the Rockies," and today is the oldest operating brewery in Montana. Brewers Thorsten Geuera and Jürgen Knöller are both from Germany and use all German equipment and recipes.  Knöller was born and raised in Bavaria, Germany (Bayern in German, hence the company's name), where he was apprenticed. He graduated as a Masterbrewer from Doemans' Masterschool for Brewing and Soft Drink Technology in Munich in 1987, after which he became the brewmaster for Bayern Brewing.

All beer at Bayern is brewed according to Reinheitsgebot, otherwise known as the German Beer Purity Law or the Bavarian Purity Law.  The law, originating in the city of Ingolstadt in the duchy of Bavaria, Germany in 1516, concerns the standards for the sale and composition of beer. In the original text, the only ingredients that could be used in the production of beer were water, barley, and hops. The law also set the price of beer at 1-2 Pfennig per Maß.

At almost 10,000 barrels of brew a year, Bayern is the second largest brewery in Montana after Big Sky Brewing. Knöller has had facilities at three different locations, but the most recent move in 2002 was structured so that it could be expanded to produce up to 100,000 barrels per year if needed.

Awards

Beaver Creek Brewery

Located at the edge of Eastern Montana, Beaver Creek Brewery describes itself as "an oasis in a desert of no microbreweries".  As of 2008, the brewery was brewing at its capacity of about 200 barrels a year, and, despite its low production, has a distribution area spanning hundreds of miles because of the low population density of the region.

The brewery was set up in Wibaux's historic old business district with equipment salvaged from the former Milestown Brewing Company in a former grocery store that had been closed since 1986.  As of 2012, Beaver Creek Brewery is the only brewery in the southeast region of Montana.

Big Sky Brewing Co.

Big Sky Brewing Company is a microbrewery in Missoula, founded in 1995 by Neal Leathers, Bjorn Nabozney, and Brad Robinson.

Awards

Blackfoot River Brewing

Blackfoot River Brewing is a microbrewery in Helena, opened in 1998 by Brian Smith, Greg Wermers, and Brad Simshaw.

Blacksmith Brewing Company

Blacksmith Brewing Company is a brewpub/brewery in Stevensville, opened in 2008 by Eric Hayes.

Bozeman Brewing Company

Bozeman Brewing Company is a microbrewery in Bozeman, opened by Todd Scott in 2001.

Flagship Beer: Bozone Select

Carter's Brewing

Carter's Brewing Company is a brewpub in Billings, opened in 2007 by Michael, Becky, and Carter Uhrich.

Draught Works Brewery

Draught Works Brewery is a microbrewery and tasting room in Missoula.  It was opened by Paul Marshall and Jeff Grant in 2011.  Both studied brewing at the Siebel Institute of Technology and World Brewing Academy in Chicago.  The brewery has six flagship beers.

Flathead Lake Brewing Company

Flathead Lake Brewing Company is a brewpub/brewery in Woods Bay, opened in 2004 by Greg Johnston and Terry Leonard.

Glacier Brewing Company

Glacier Brewing Company is a microbrewery in Polson, opened in 2003 by Dave Ayers. Purchased Dec 5th, 2019 by Ron May

Great Northern Brewing Company

Great Northern Brewing Company is a microbrewery in Whitefish, opened in 1995 by Minott Wessinger.

Flagship Beer: Black Star Double Hopped Golden Lager

Harvest Moon Brewing Company

Harvest Moon Brewing Company is a microbrewery in Belt, opened in 1996 by Stan Guedesse.

Flagship Beer: Beltian White

Kettle House Brewing Company

Kettle House Brewing Company is a brewery in Missoula that started in 1991 by Tim O'Leary as a "you-brew."  It now consists of two separate small brewing facilities and taprooms in Missoula.  

Flagship Beer: Cold Smoke Scotch Ale

Lone Peak Brewery

Lone Peak Brewery is a brewpub/brewery in Big Sky, opened in 2008 by Steve Nordahl.

Montana Brewing Company

Montana Brewing Company is a brewpub/brewery in Billings, opened in 1994 by CSKT INC.

Muddy Creek Brewing Company

Muddy Creek Brewing Company was a microbrewery located in Butte, opened February 27, 2015 by Gregg Wigen, Chris Sherman, and Todd McAdams. The brewery burned down January 23, 2020.

Background and Grand Opening

Awards
(as of April 2017)

Philipsburg Brewing Company

Philipsburg Brewing Company is a craft brewery located in Philipsburg, opened in August 2012.

Quarry Brewing

Quarry Brewery is a microbrewery in Butte, opened in 2007 by Chuck Schnabel.

Red Lodge Ales Brewing Company

Red Lodge Ales Brewing Company is a microbrewery in Red Lodge, opened in 1998 by Sam Hoffmann.  Its head brewer and production manager is Justin Moore. Lead brewers are Rush Nicholson and Dylan Shanks. Sales team are Doug the Beerbarian Bailey, Andy Simpson, and Phil Bridges.

The brewery produced nearly 8,000 barrels in 2014, boasts the largest solar thermal array in the state, and distributes to central and eastern Montana, western North Dakota, and northern Wyoming.

Tamarack Brewing

Tamarack Brewing Company is a brewpub/brewery in Lakeside, opened in 2007.

Flagship Beer: Yard Sale Ale

Wildwood Brewing

Wildwood Brewing Company is a brewery opened by Jim Lueders in Stevensville in 2012.

Defunct
Though Montana had a robust early brewery history, many notable companies were severely weakened by Prohibition and others finished off by the expansion of national breweries.

Anaconda
 Anaconda Brewing Company - 1900–1958

Butte
 Tivoli Brewery

Helena
 Kessler Brewing Company - 1865–1958; 1984–2000

Kalispell
 Kalispell Malting and Brewing Company - 1893–1955

Montana Brewers Association (MBA)
The Montana Brewers Association was founded in 2008. Its previous name was the Montana State Brewers Association, established in 1997.

Its purpose is the promotion of the production and sales of the freshest and highest quality Montana-made beers through education, public awareness and support for local breweries' products, profession, and histories, while documenting their economic impact and legal responsibilities throughout the state.

A Drink in Every Hand
We strive to present the most up-to-date information about the Montana craft alcohol scene in a clear and concise format. To do this, we continue to lean on our personal experience, knowledge, and relationships with breweries, wineries, cideries, distilleries, and other locations across Montana to serve up the most current information!

See also 
 Beer in the United States
 List of breweries in the United States
 List of microbreweries

References

Montana
Breweries